The 2011–12 UANL season was the 65th professional season of Mexico's top-flight football league. The season is split into two tournaments—the Torneo Apertura and the Torneo Clausura—each with identical formats and each contested by the same eighteen teams. UANL began their season on July 23, 2011 against Cruz Azul, UANL play their home games on Saturdays at 7:00pm local time.

Torneo Apertura

Squad

 (Team Vice-Captain)

 
 

 (Team captain)

Regular season

Apertura 2011 results

Final phase

UANL advanced 4–0 on aggregate

UANL advanced 1–0 on aggregate

UANL won 4–1 on aggregate

UANL won their third league title in history

Goalscorers

Results

Results summary

Results by round

Transfers

In

Out

Torneo Clausura

Squad

 (Team Vice-Captain)

 
 
 

 (Team captain)

Regular season

Clausura 2012 results

Final phase

UANL advanced 5–1 on aggregate

Santos Laguna advanced 3–3 on aggregate due to being the higher seed in the classification phase

Goalscorers

Regular season

Source:

Final phase

Results

Results summary

Results by round

Copa Libertadores

Preliminary Round 

Unión Española won on points 4–1.

Goalscorers

References

2011–12 Primera División de México season
Mexican football clubs 2011–12 season